The Night Holds Terror is a 1955 American crime film noir based on a true incident, written and directed by Andrew L. Stone and starring Vince Edwards, John Cassavetes and Jack Kelly.

Plot
Family man Gene Courtier picks up hitchhiker Victor Gosset, a wanted criminal who was a dangle for a gang of three robbers headed by Robert Batsford and new addition Luther Logan.  When the gang discovers he only has a few dollars in cash they decide to force Courtier to sell his valuable car and turn the money over to them.  The dealer can't pay such a large sum out so late in the day, so they leave with Courtier and head to the family home in a nearby suburban development.  The plan is to overnight there, accompany Courtier in the morning so he can collect his money, and leave. Instead of crashing his car and bringing attention to himself and the criminals, he foolishly places his entire family in mortal danger.

The night becomes a night of terror, anxiety and bickering for both Courtiers, and upheaval and fear for their two young children.

In the morning Courtier's family is left behind, unhurt, and the plan to get the car proceeds successfully.  Before Courtier can be murdered on a desert turnoff, one of the hoodlums, Logan, suggests they instead hold him for ransom.  He has discovered Courtier's father owns a chain of stores in the Los Angeles area, and Batsford decides to demand $200,000.  The senior Courtier is given overnight to round such a large sum then up.

Meanwhile, Courtier's wife calls the police, who begin to trace any calls they can between the gang and any principals.  The hoodlums retire with Courtier to their expensive hillside hideout, and behind the scenes the police begin to close in.  There is friction within the gang, and a combined escape attempt of Logan and Courtier ends up with Logan shot dead by Batsford and Courtier recaptured.

Ultimately Mrs. Courtier stalls long enough for a successful trace.  The police are ready, and scores of squad cars close in on the target area.  There is a shootout near a phonebooth in a deserted industrial area, Batsford and Gossett are wounded, and Courtier is safely reunited with his wife.

Cast
 Jack Kelly as Gene Courtier
 Hildy Parks as Doris Courtier
 Vince Edwards as Victor Gosset
 John Cassavetes as Robert Batsford
 David Cross as Luther Logan
 Eddie Marr as Captain Cole
 Jack Kruschen as Detective Pope
 Joyce McCluskey as Phyllis Harrison
 Jonathan Hale as Bob Henderson
 Barney Phillips as Stranske
 Roy Neal as TV Newsreader
 Joel Marston as Reporter
 Guy Kingsford as Police Technician
 Stanley Andrews as Mr Courtier (uncredited)
 Charles Herbert as Steven Courtier (uncredited)
 Barbara Woodell as Mrs. Osmond (uncredited)
 William Woodson as Narrator (uncredited)

The Actual Crime
The date was February 13, 1953. Eugene M. Courtier was an Edwards Air Force Base technician, and the kidnapping took place on a Lancaster, CA highway; the used car sale also took place in Lancaster. The criminals were Leonard Daniel Mahan, James Bartley Carrigan, and Don Eugene Hall.  All survived the ordeal, and were tried and sentenced.

A detailed description of the crime – which lacks most of the dramatics of the overnight hostage situation at the Courtier home portrayed in the movie and instead describes making and eating breakfast together, serving coffee, playing and dancing to music (without any stated coercion) – is contained in a related court document. 
  There is no description of any gunfight or violence during the kidnapper's apprehension.

An appeal by Mahan for a mistrial over the failure of the presiding judge to instruct the jury to disregard any description of an incident in which Courtier and his father physically attacked Mahan in the courtroom (in the absence of the jury) was denied.

Reception
The New York Times stated that the director "must be accorded a bright green light for what he has accomplished in this tight, economical and steadily suspenseful little picture" even though it "is far from memorable".

TV Guide called it "A well-constructed, powerful film."

See also
The Desperate Hours, a similar 1955 film
List of American films of 1955
List of films featuring home invasions

References

External links
 
 
 
 The Night Holds Terror informational site and DVD review at DVD Beaver (includes images)
 

1955 films
1955 crime films
American black-and-white films
American crime films
Articles containing video clips
Columbia Pictures films
Crime films based on actual events
Film noir
Films about hostage takings
Films directed by Andrew L. Stone
Films about hitchhiking
Home invasions in film
1950s English-language films
1950s American films